Heane is a surname. Notable people with this surname include:

 George Heane (1904–1969), English cricket player
 James Heane (1874–1954), Australian colonel
 James Heane (died 1655), English general

See also
 Heale
 Heaney